Qaleh Hamam Rural District is a rural district (dehestan) in Salehabad County, Razavi Khorasan Province, Iran. At the 2006 census, its population was 7,687, in 1,668 families.  The rural district has 18 villages.

References 

Rural Districts of Razavi Khorasan Province
Salehabad County